This is a list of ships built by John Brown & Company at their shipyard in Clydebank, Scotland.

A

B

RMS Britannia (1838)

C

D

E

F

G

H

I

J

K

L

M
The steamship RMS Mauretania (1906) was constructed by Swan Hunter Wigham & Richardson, ship builders, not John Brown & Co.of Clydebank Scotland.
}

N

 (renamed )

O

P

Q

SS Queen Elizabeth 2

R

S

San Juan (1937)
San Luis (1937)

T

U

V

W

SS Wonga Wonga (1853, Yard Number 13.

X

Y

Z

References

John Brown and Company